Raja Rani (ರಾಜ ರಾಣಿ) is a Kannada couple reality show aired on  Colors Kannada and streamed on Voot. It features celebrity couples as contestants who are competing for the title Raja Rani. The judges of the show are Srujan Lokesh and Tara. The show is hosted by Anupama Gowda. The show premiered on 10 July 2021.

Production 
A celebrity couple gameshow like none other, featuring 12 awesome duos competing for the title of Raja Rani! Each week brings unique themed tasks and challenges where the couples will not just have to win the game but also win hearts with their compatibility and entertaining ability. The surviving duo will be crowned Raja Rani. The show is produced by Pixel Pictures Private Limited.

Contestants 
A total of 12 celebrity couples, mostly TV actors are part  of the show.

Weekly summary

References 

2021 Indian television series debuts
Kannada-language television shows
Colors Kannada original programming
Indian television series based on non-Indian television series
Indian dance television shows
Celebrity reality television series